Lleyton is a male given name. Notable people with the name include:

 Lleyton Brooks (born 2001), Australian soccer footballer
 Lleyton Hewitt (born 1981), Australian tennis player

See also
 Leyton (disambiguation)
 Layton (disambiguation)
 Leighton (disambiguation)

Masculine given names